Maurice Egerton (4 August 1874 – 30 January 1958) was the fourth Baron Egerton. He was a member of the Egerton family and was the only son of Alan de Tatton Egerton, 3rd Baron Egerton and his wife Lady Anna Louisa.

Maurice was known as an aviation and motor car enthusiast, a friend to the Wright brothers. His name is listed on the Memorial to the Home of Aviation on the Isle of Sheppey, marking him out as a pioneering early aviatior. He served as a lieutenant in the Royal Naval Volunteer Reserve during the First World War after which he was granted some land in Ngata area near Nakuru in Kenya under the Soldier Settlement Scheme. He later purchased a further 21,000 acres around the same area from Lord Delamere. On this land, he founded a school in 1939 named Egerton Farm School (now Egerton University). The school was meant to prepare white European youth for careers in agriculture. Also on his land he built Lord Egerton Castle from 1938 to 1954.

Maurice did not marry and on his death in 1958 the barony became extinct, and Tatton Park was given to the National Trust while Lord Egerton Castle was given to Egerton University, who manage it to this day.

References

External links 
 Tatton Park - Maurice Egerton 1874 - 1958
 Egerton, Maurice (1874-1958) 4th Baron Egerton of Tatton

1874 births
1958 deaths
Barons in the Peerage of the United Kingdom
Maurice
Settlers of Kenya
British emigrants to Kenya
Eldest sons of British hereditary barons
Tatton family